Andres Amador is an American artist, known for his large-scale organic sand drawings.

Early years
He grew up in San Francisco and received a BA in Environmental Science. He joined the Peace Corps and then became a computer technician. In 1999, he made a visit to the Burning Man, a life-changing experience that led him to quit his job and start a new life.

Artistic beginnings
He was drawn to ancient geometric art after studying crop circle reconstructions. in 2004 on Kalalau Beach on the Hawaiian island of Kaua' he was showing a friend the geometric art he had been studying by drawing in the sand with stick. He had a sudden brainstorm that he could create enormous designs in the sand. His first creation was in 2004 on Ocean Beach in San Francisco.

Art
Amador has created artistic drawings on beaches in the United States, Mexico and the Channel Islands. Working on about 30 beaches, he has drawn hundreds of these short-lived artworks. His work usually takes no more than two hours to create and is done with tools that look like rakes. His earthscapes fall into two categories. Some are geometric while others are organic or free form. He creates commissioned work and installations for businesses and individuals across the US and Europe. he also has Playa Painting Workships where participants collaborate to design and create their own sand artwork.

Philosophy
"If I can inspire others, I hope that I can offer the message that the path is more important than the destination -- that the journey should be the focus. When one is experiencing joy, then the world also receives that joy. And the world can always use more joy."

References

External links
 Official website

Living people
Year of birth missing (living people)
Artists from San Francisco
Place of birth missing (living people)